Marja Viitahuhta (née Mikkonen) (born 1979) is a Finnish artist and filmmaker. Her short films have been presented at major international festivals around the world and have won various prizes, including 2nd prize Cinéfondation at the 2004 Cannes Film Festival.

Mikkonen lives and works in Helsinki, Finland.

References

External links

1979 births
Living people
Finnish filmmakers
21st-century Finnish women artists